Nathan Bailey (born 24 July 1993) is a British trampoline gymnast. He competed in the trampoline competition at the 2016 Summer Olympics, where he finished in 9th place.

References

1993 births
Living people
British male trampolinists
Olympic gymnasts of Great Britain
Gymnasts at the 2016 Summer Olympics
Gymnasts at the 2010 Summer Youth Olympics
Medalists at the Trampoline Gymnastics World Championships
21st-century British people